Bulatovo is a rural locality (a selo) in Kuyagansky Selsoviet, Altaysky District, Altai Krai, Russia. The population was 42 as of 2013. There are 3 streets.

Geography 
Bulatovo is located 72 km WSW of Altayskoye (the district's administrative centre) by road. Kazanka is the nearest rural locality.

References 

Rural localities in Altaysky District, Altai Krai